Edward Berwick (January 25, 1843 – January 28, 1934) was an English-American farmer who raised crops, orchards, and livestock. He settled in Carmel Valley, California in 1869 and developed the Berwick Manor and Orchard. He planted the first commercial pear orchard, specializing in the Winter Nelis pear. He was nationally known for his work for peace and the parcel post. He was the first person to raise winter pears on a commercial scale.

Early life

Berwick was born in St George Hanover Square, London, England on January 25, 1843. He was the son of James Berwick (1801-1864) and Nacy Mary Handley (1808-1865).  He was tall, blue-eyed, and developed a local reputation as a scholar. He was educated in London at Camden House School, King's College and through lectures at the Royal Society in Albemarle Street Hall. He spent his early years as a clerk in a banking house. Then in 1895, at the age of 22, he sailed for California. 

Berwick married Isabella Richardson (1832-1909) on September 13, 1867 in San Francisco, California. They had three children. Their son, Edward Berwick Jr., died on February 5, 1909, at age 34, when he was engaged to Edith Jordan, daughter of Stanford University President David Starr Jordan.

Career

Edward Berwick arrived in California on July 17, 1865, and worked for Jeoffry Cullen on the Piojo Ranch cattle ranch of 13,000 acres at San Antonio Mission in southern Monterey County. He also worked at the San Miguelito Ranch and the Santa Rita Ranch. 

On September 23, 1869, they soon moved to Carmel Valley, California and purchased 120 acres near Robinson Canyon Road for $500 in gold. The property is known as the Berwick Manor and Orchard. It included a ranch house, garden, pool, and barns. Berwick went on to launch a successful orchard business, where he planted the first commercial pear orchard, specializing in the Winter Nelis pear. His pears became world famous as the "Berwick Pear", known for their quality. He shipped the pears each year to London and Paris. He cultivated and sold walnuts, apples, vegetables, pears, and strawberries. Berwick built a reservoir system and windmill on the property to irrigate his orchard and garden.

The property has been held by four families, since its initial parceling in the Mexican land grant in present-day Monterey County, California given on January 27, 1840, to Antonio Romero by Governor Juan Alvarado. It was used during the Great Depression by the federal government to teach local ranchers more scientific farming methods. The farm has been in continual ownership and operation by the Berwick family since 1869 and is the only intact farmstead of this period left in Carmel Valley.

Berwick sponsored the growing delivery business, United Parcel Service, and became the first president of the Postal Post League of California, fighting for parcel post and Postal Svings-Banks.  He was a scholar who taught at the Carmelo School, which was Carmel Valley's first schoolhouse. He was a writer, speaker and advocate of local sanitation and world peace. 

In 1881, the Berwicks built a house at 343 Ocean View Avenue, Pacific Grove, California. Berwick traveled to Carmel Valley to take care and manage the orchard.

Berwick entertained the writer Robert Louis Stevenson when the writer was out hiking in the area. Berwick was a member of the California Academy of Sciences for 30 years. He published in the Pacific Rural Press, Arena, Cosmopolitan and The World's Work magazines and the Daily Standard of London. During 1903 and 1905 he was a lecturer for the Farmers Institute at the University of California.

Death
Berwick of Pacific Grove, died on January 28, 1934, in Monterey, California. He was 91 years old. He was buried at the El Carmelo Cemetery, in Pacific Grove.

See also
 Berwick Manor and Orchard

References

External links

The Urgent Need of Our Pacific Coast States, by Edward Berwick, The Arena (1897)
Offshore Whaling In The Bay Of Monterey, by Edward Berwick, The Cosmopolitan (1900)
 Pacific Rural Press articles by Edward Berwick (1901)
 A Farmer Whose Son Is Also A Farmer, by Edward Berwick, The World's Work (1901)
 National Register of Historic Places in Monterey County
 Berwick Manor and Orchard

1843 births
1934 deaths
People from London
People from Monterey County, California
19th-century American businesspeople